Future Blues is the fifth album by American blues and rock band Canned Heat, released in 1970.  It was the last to feature the band's classic lineup, as Larry Taylor and Harvey Mandel had both departed by July 1970, prior to its release to record with John Mayall and songwriter Alan Wilson died shortly after on September 3, 1970. It was also the only classic-era Canned Heat studio album to feature Mandel, as Henry Vestine had been the lead guitarist on the previous albums. Their cover of "Let's Work Together" by Wilbert Harrison became a hit.  "London Blues" features Dr. John. It was re-released on CD in 2002 by MAM productions with five bonus tracks.

Track listing

Side one
"Sugar Bee" (Eddie Shuler) – 2:39
"Shake It and Break It" (Charlie Patton) – 2:35
"That's All Right (Mama)" (Arthur "Big Boy" Crudup) – 4:19
"My Time Ain't Long" (Alan Wilson) – 3:49
"Skat" (Wilson) – 2:44
"Let's Work Together" (Wilbert Harrison) – 2:53

Side two
"London Blues" (Wilson) – 5:31
"So Sad (The World's in a Tangle)" (Canned Heat) – 7:57
"Future Blues" (Canned Heat) – 2:58

Bonus tracks from 2000 CD release (Repertoire REP 4889)
"Let's Work Together" Single Mono Version (Harrison) – 2:46
"Skat" Single Mono Version (Wilson) – 2:39
"Wooly Bully" (Sam Samudio) – 2:30
"Christmas Blues" Canned Heat and The Chipmunks (Cook, Taylor, Vestine, Wilson, Hite Jr.) – 2:31
"The Chipmunk Song (Christmas Don't Be Late)" Canned Heat and The Chipmunks (Ross Bagdasarian) – 2:45

Personnel

Canned Heat
 Bob Hite – vocals
 Alan Wilson – slide guitar, vocals, harmonica
 Harvey Mandel – lead guitar
 Larry Taylor – bass
 Adolfo de la Parra – drums

Additional musicians
 Dr. John – piano, horn arrangements (tracks 5 & 7)
Ernest Lane – piano (track 9)

Technical
 Skip Taylor – producer
 Canned Heat – producer
 Tommy Oliver – engineer

References

1970 albums
Canned Heat albums
Liberty Records albums
Albums arranged by Dr. John
MAM Records albums
Albums produced by Bob Hite
Albums produced by Adolfo de la Parra
Albums produced by Harvey Mandel
Albums produced by Alan Wilson (musician)
Albums produced by Larry Taylor